St. Ignatius or Ignatios, (c. 798 – 23 October 877) was a Patriarch of Constantinople from July 4, 847, to October 23, 858, and from November 23, 867, to his death on October 23, 877. In the Catholic Church and Eastern Orthodox churches, he is regarded as a saint, with a feast day of October 23.

Biography

Ignatius, originally named Niketas, was a son of the Emperor Michael I Rangabe and Prokopia. His maternal grandfather was Nikephoros I. Although he was still a child, Niketas had been appointed nominal commander of the new corps of imperial guards, the Hikanatoi. He was forcibly castrated (and thus made ineligible for becoming emperor, since the emperor could not be a eunuch) and tonsured after his father's deposition in 813. He founded three monasteries on the Princes' Islands, a favourite place for exiling tonsured members of the imperial house.

Empress Theodora appointed Ignatius, a staunch opponent of Iconoclasm, to succeed Methodios I as patriarch of Constantinople in 847.  Ignatius soon became embroiled in the conflict between the Stoudites and the moderates in the Church, the issue being whether or not to depose clergymen who had cooperated with iconoclast policies in the past.  Ignatius took the side of the conservative Stoudites and deposed the archbishop of Syracuse, Gregory Asbestas, the leader of the moderate party. Asbestas appealed for redress to Pope Leo IV and thus inaugurated a period of friction in relations between the Roman and Constantinopolitan churches.

A fervent critic of the Caesar Bardas, Ignatius lost support after Emperor Michael III and Bardas removed Theodora from influence in 857. Ignatius was forced to resign in 858 and was replaced by the layman Photios. Those questions were discussed at councils held in Constantinople in 859, and again in 861. When Photios reversed some of his predecessor's policies, Ignatius's supporters appealed to Pope Nicholas I, who at first tried to stay out of the controversy, but then condemned Photios (863). The immediate issues in the conflict were the question of papal precedence over the patriarch, and jurisdiction over newly converted Bulgaria.

In 867 Basil I the Macedonian usurped the throne and, seeking an alliance with Nicholas I and Louis II, Holy Roman Emperor, banished Photios and restored Ignatius on the patriarchal throne.  Reinstated, Ignatius persuaded the Bulgarian prince to expel the hierarchy of the Latin rite from Bulgaria in 870.  Since Ignatius and Photios pursued the same policy, the latter was recalled and reinstated as tutor to the emperor's children. 

Of him the Roman Martyrology recorded the following: "At Constantinople St. Ignatius, Bishop, who, when he had reproved Bardas the Cæsar for having repudiated his wife, was attacked by many injuries and sent into exile; but having been restored by the Roman Pontiff Nicholas, at last he went to his rest in peace." When he died in October 877, Photios was reinstated as patriarch and contributed to Ignatius's canonisation.

See also
 Council of Constantinople (861)
 Council of Constantinople (867)
 Council of Constantinople (869-870)
 Schism of 863

References

Sources

External links 
The Oxford Dictionary of Byzantium, Oxford University Press, 1991.

790s births
877 deaths
Saints from Anatolia
9th-century patriarchs of Constantinople
9th-century Christian saints
Nikephorian dynasty
Castrated people
Sons of Byzantine emperors